Everett Building may refer to:

 Everett Building (Huntsville, Alabama)
 Everett Building (Manhattan)
 Everett Buildings (Albany, Western Australia)